Lawkland is a civil parish in the Craven district of North Yorkshire, England, near the A65 and  west of Settle.  It lies within the Forest of Bowland Area of Outstanding Natural Beauty but was not part of the ancient Forest or the Lordship of Bowland. There is no Lawkland village as such although there are clusters of farms and dwellings around Lawkland Green and Eldroth.

In 2014 those parts of Lawkland parish north of the A65 (including the hamlet of Feizor) were transferred to Austwick parish.  Lawkland parish gained those parts of Austwick parish south of the A65. Lawkland does not have a parish council but does have an annual parish meeting.

References

External links

Villages in North Yorkshire
Civil parishes in North Yorkshire
Forest of Bowland